is a railway station located in the town of Naraha, Fukushima Prefecture, Japan, operated by the East Japan Railway Company (JR East).

Lines
Tatsuta Station is served by the Jōban Line, and is located 240.9 km from the official starting point of the line at Nippori Station.

Station layout
The station has a single island platform and a single side platform, connected to the station building by a footbridge. The station is staffed.

Platforms

History
On March 25, 1909, the station began operation. Passenger service began on April 25, 1909 after one month of freight service. The station was absorbed into the JR East network upon the privatization of the Japanese National Railways (JNR) on April 1, 1987.

Due to the Fukushima Daiichi nuclear disaster in 2011, operations were halted. Operations south of the station were resumed on June 1, 2014. Operations to Tomioka resumed on 21 September 2017.

Passenger statistics
In fiscal 2018, the station was used by an average of 192 passengers daily (boarding passengers only). The passenger figures for previous years are as shown below.

Surrounding area
Tatsuta is within the evacuation zone surrounding the Fukushima Daiichi Nuclear Power Plant. Since August 2012 it has been possible to enter the area, but remaining in the area overnight is prohibited.
Naraha Town Hall
Naraha Post Office

References

External links

 Station information JR East Station Information 

Railway stations in Fukushima Prefecture
Jōban Line
Railway stations in Japan opened in 1909
Stations of East Japan Railway Company
Naraha, Fukushima